Carol Lynn Baily (born October 22, 1950) is an American former professional tennis player.

A native of Colorado, Baily played in two national championship teams with Arizona State University and finished her collegiate career at the University of Colorado.

While competing on tour she featured twice in the singles main draw of the US Open and had a win over Kathy Jordan at the 1981 National Panasonic Classic. In 1982 she won a WTA Tour (Avon) doubles title in Newport.

Baily, a longtime Steamboat Springs resident, is a member of the Colorado Sports Hall of Fame.

WTA Tour finals

Doubles (1–0)

References

External links
 
 

1950 births
Living people
American female tennis players
Arizona State Sun Devils women's tennis players
Colorado Buffaloes women's tennis players
Tennis people from Colorado